Webster County Courthouse may refer to:

 Webster County Courthouse (Georgia), Preston, Georgia
 Webster County Courthouse (Iowa), Fort Dodge, Iowa
 Webster County Courthouse (Kentucky), Dixon, Kentucky
 Webster County Courthouse (Mississippi), Walthall, Mississippi, a Mississippi Landmark
 Webster County Courthouse (Nebraska), Red Cloud, Nebraska